Boris Mikhailovich Tenin (23 March 1905, Kuznetsk – 8 September 1990, Moscow) was a Soviet and Russian stage and film actor and pedagogue. People's Artist of the USSR (1981).

Biography 
Boris Tenin was born in Kuznetsk in a family of a railroad telegraphist.

He was married to Lidiya Sukharevskaya until his death in Moscow, 1990.

Filmography 
 Counterplan (1932) as Vasya
 Without a Dowry (1936) as Vasily Danilych Vozhevatov
 The Man with the Gun (1938) as Ivan Shadrin
 Yakov Sverdlov (1940) as coupletist (uncredited)
 Hello Moscow! (1945) as writer
 The Russian Question (1947) as Bob Murphy
 Alitet Leaves for the Hills (1949) as Charlie Thomson
 The Fall of Berlin (1949) as Vasily Chuikov
 Przhevalsky (1951) as cossack Yegorov
 The Great Warrior Skanderbeg (1953) as Din
 Least We Forget (1954) as Maryan Maksimovich
 Behind Show Windows (1955) as Yegor Petrovich Bozhko
 For the Power of the Soviets (1956) as Zhora Kolesnichuk

Awards and honors 

 Honored Artist of the RSFSR (1939)
 Two Orders of the Red Banner of Labour (1939, for his portrayal of Ivan Shadrin in The Man with the Gun; 1985)
 People's Artist of the Tajik SSR (1944)
 Medal "For the Defence of Leningrad" (1946)
 Medal "For Valiant Labour in the Great Patriotic War 1941–1945" (1946)
 Medal "In Commemoration of the 800th Anniversary of Moscow" (1948)
 Stalin Prize, 1st class (1948) for his portrayal of Bob Murphy in The Russian Question
 People's Artist of the RSFSR (1950)
 Medal "In Commemoration of the 250th Anniversary of Leningrad"
 Jubilee Medal "In Commemoration of the 100th Anniversary of the Birth of Vladimir Ilyich Lenin" (1970)
 Jubilee Medal "Thirty Years of Victory in the Great Patriotic War 1941–1945"
 People's Artist of the USSR (1981)
 Jubilee Medal "Forty Years of Victory in the Great Patriotic War 1941–1945"
 Medal "Veteran of Labour" (1985)

References

External links 
 

1905 births
1990 deaths
20th-century Russian male actors
People from Kuznetsk
People from Kuznetsky Uyezd (Saratov Governorate)
Russian Academy of Theatre Arts alumni
Honored Artists of the RSFSR
People's Artists of the RSFSR
People's Artists of Tajikistan
People's Artists of the USSR
Stalin Prize winners
Recipients of the Order of the Red Banner of Labour
Russian male film actors
Russian male stage actors
Russian male television actors
Soviet male film actors
Soviet male stage actors
Soviet male television actors
Burials at Vagankovo Cemetery